Angelina Sergeyevna Kudryavtseva (born 21 October 2005) is a Cypriot ice dancer who competes for Cyprus. With her skating partner, Ilia Karankevich, she is the 2021 JGP Poland bronze medalist, and competed in the free dance at two World Junior Championships.

Personal life 
Kudryavtseva was born on 21 October 2005 in Liubertsy, Russia, a suburb of Moscow, to parents Sergei and Olga, both real estate developers. She has an older sister, Ekaterina, and two younger brothers, Alexander and Mikhail.

Career

2019–20 season: Junior international debut 
Kudryavtseva/Karankevich made their junior international debut in August of 2019 at the NRW Trophy where they placed fifth in the junior division. From there, the team received two Junior Grand Prix assignments, and at the 2019 JGP France and 2019 JGP Latvia they finished fourteenth and tenth, respectively. They competed six more times internationally in the lead up to the 2020 World Junior Championships, including taking the junior title at the 2019 Open d'Andorra and earning the junior silver medal at 2019 Grand Prix of Bratislava. At Junior Worlds in March, they placed eighteenth in the rhythm dance, which qualified them to advance in the competition. In the free dance, the team dropped to twentieth place in the segment and overall.

2020–21 season 
Due to the COVID-19 pandemic, Kudryavtseva/Karankevich only had the opportunity to compete twice internationally during the 2020–21 season. They took the junior ice dance titles at the 2020 Ice Star in October 2020 and the 2021 LuMi Dance Trophy in February 2021.

2021–22 season 
Kudryavtseva/Karankevich opened their third junior season at the 2021 JGP Slovakia in Košice. They set a new personal best to place fourth in the rhythm dance, but later dropped to seventh in the free dance and seventh overall. At their second JGP assignment, 2021 JGP Poland, Kudryavtseva/Karankevich placed fourth in the rhythm dance, scoring just shy of their personal best, but advanced onto the podium by scoring a new personal best in the free dance to place third in that segment and third overall. Their bronze medal was the first medal for Cyprus in ice dance on the Junior Grand Prix circuit.

Due to the pandemic, the 2022 World Junior Championships could not be held as scheduled in Sofia in early March, and as a result were rescheduled for Tallinn in mid-April. Due to Vladimir Putin's invasion of Ukraine, the International Skating Union banned all Russian and Belarusian athletes from participating, which had a significant impact on the dance field. Kudryavtseva/Karankevich placed fifth in the rhythm dance with a new personal best score of 62.15. They were eighth in the free dance, dropping to eighth overall.

2022–23 season 
Returning to the Junior Grand Prix, Kudryavtseva/Karankevich came fifth at the 2022 JGP Poland and seventh at the 2022 JGP Italy. They later won gold at both the Bosphorus Cup and the Pavel Roman Memorial.

Kudryavtseva/Karankevich finished the season with a tenth-place at the 2023 World Junior Championships.

Programs

With Karankevich

Competitive highlights 
JGP: Junior Grand Prix

With Karankevich for Cyprus

Detailed results 
Small medals for short and free programs awarded only at ISU Championships.

Junior level 
With Karankevich

References

External links 
 

2005 births
Living people
Figure skaters from Moscow
Cypriot sportswomen
Cypriot figure skaters
People of Greek Cypriot descent